Colonial Bank may refer to:

 Colonial Bank (United States)
 Colonial Bank (West Indies)
 Colonial Bank of Australasia
 Colonial Bank of Issue
 Colonial Bank of New Zealand